Juárez is a Spanish surname. Notable people with the surname include:

Adrián Juárez Jiménez (born 1978), Mexican politician
Agustín Juárez (born 1943), Mexican cyclist
Ana Luz Juárez Alejo, Mexican lawyer and politician
Axel Juárez (born 1990), Argentine footballer
Benito Juárez (1806–1872), Mexican president and Supreme Court magistrate
Carlos Eleodoro Juárez (born 1938), Argentine chess player
Daniel Juárez (born 1975), Argentine footballer
Efraín Juárez (born 1988), Mexican footballer
Elio Juárez (born 1942), Uruguayan cyclist
Giselle Juárez (field hockey) (born 1991), Argentine field hockey player
Heidy Juárez (born 1977), Guatemalan taekwondo practitioner
Iván Juárez (born 1976), Argentine footballer
Lourdes Juárez (born 1986), Mexican professional boxer
Mariana Juárez (born 1980), Mexican professional boxer
Natalia Juárez (born 1995), Mexican actress
Verónica Juárez Piña (born 1971), Mexican politician

Spanish-language surnames